The Bally Bomber B-17 is a one third scale, single seat, homebuilt aircraft, intended as a replica of the Boeing B-17 Flying Fortress. that made its debut during AirVenture 2018. The aircraft was put up for sale in 2018, and her builder died in June of 2020. 
The aircraft returned to AirVenture 2021 piloted by her new owner, Larry Neu, of San Antonio, Texas

Design and development

The Bally Bomber B-17 is an original design by Jack Bally, EAA 348338. The aircraft is a four-engined, retractable conventional landing gear equipped, low wing monoplane. The fuselage is all riveted aluminum in construction with hexagonal bulkheads. The drawings were modified from a one ninth scale set of radio-controlled aircraft plans. Despite being a scale replica, the aircraft is relatively large for a homebuilt aircraft with  wingspan. Most homebuilt aircraft are single engine designs with a few twin engine models produced, making the four-engined homebuilt a rarity in itself.

The Bally Bomber took 17 years and 40,000 man-hours to get into the air, and eventually to the EAA AirVenture Convention held annually in Oshkosh, Wisconsin. Thousands of EAA members have followed Bally’s progress for years, and AirVenture 2018 attendees had a chance to see the finished result in person.

Specifications (Bally B-17)

See also

References

Homebuilt aircraft